Odenyevskaya is a rural locality (a village) in Kumzerskoye Rural Settlement, Kharovsky District, Vologda Oblast, Russia. The population was 17 as of 2002.

Geography 
Odenyevskaya is located 56 km northwest of Kharovsk (the district's administrative centre) by road. Pashinskaya is the nearest rural locality.

References 

Rural localities in Kharovsky District